Cape Santa Maria Airport  was a PRIVATE use ONLY se airport located near Cape Santa Maria, the Bahamas.It is on private land and is not in any way affiliated with the nearby Cape Santa Maria Resort. The nearest usable airport is Stella Maris SML, about 20 minutes away. 

The runway is currently CLOSED and over grown. Do NOT try and land there.

See also
List of airports in the Bahamas

References

External links 
 Airport record for Cape Santa Maria Airport at Landings.com

Airports in the Bahamas